The 1967–68 Michigan State Spartans men's basketball team represented Michigan State University in the 1967–68 NCAA Division I men's basketball season as members of the Big Ten Conference. They played their home games at Jenison Fieldhouse in East Lansing, Michigan and were coached by John E. Benington in his third year as head coach of the Spartans. They finished the season 12–2, 6–8 in Big Ten play to finish in a three-way tie for sixth place.

Previous season 
The Spartans finished the 1966–67 season 16–7, 10–4 in Big Ten play to finish tied for the Big Ten championship. However, Indiana was selected for the NCAA tournament.

Roster and statistics 

Source

Schedule and results 

|-
!colspan=9 style=| Regular season

References 

Michigan State Spartans men's basketball seasons
Michigan State
Michigan State Spartans basketball
Michigan State Spartans basketball